XTS is a three-letter abbreviation which may refer to:
XEX-based tweaked-codebook mode with ciphertext stealing (XTS), a block cipher mode of operation used for full disk encryption
Cadillac XTS full-sized Cadillac sedan launched in 2013 model year
XTS-400, a multi-level secure computer operating system
Xochitl Torres Small, an American attorney and politician